Carol McBride Pirsch (born December 27, 1936) was a member of the Nebraska Legislature. Born to Lyle Erwin and Hilfrie Lebeck McBride in Omaha, Nebraska, Pirsch attended Beals Grade School; Central High School; Miami University in Oxford, Ohio; and the University of Nebraska at Omaha. She was married to Allen Pirsch on March 28, 1954, and they had six children: Penny Elizabeth, Pamela Elaine, Patrice Eileen, Phyllis Erika, Peter Allen and Perry Andrew.

Pirsch was first elected to the Nebraska Legislature, the 10th Legislative District, on August 11, 1978. She served 18 years in the Nebraska Legislature before her election to the Douglas County Board of Commissioners in 1996, where she served for eight years.

References

1936 births
County supervisors and commissioners in Nebraska
Living people
Politicians from Omaha, Nebraska
Nebraska state senators
Women state legislators in Nebraska
20th-century American politicians
20th-century American women politicians
21st-century American politicians
21st-century American women politicians
Miami University alumni
University of Nebraska alumni